The Legend of Johnny Cash, Vol. II is a compilation album by Johnny Cash, released posthumously on Island Records in 2006. The release was a result of the success of the 2005 career-spanning compilation The Legend of Johnny Cash. The follow-up similarly includes songs performed by Cash at various stages of his career, starting from "There You Go" from the mid-1950s and ending on a number of selections from the singer's American series, including a version of "In the Sweet By and By" from My Mother's Hymn Book and a live, orchestral version of Leonard Cohen's "Bird on a Wire".

Track listing

Charts
Album - Billboard (United States)

References

External links
 Johnny Cash's Official Website

Legend of Johnny Cash Vol. II, The
Legend of Johnny Cash Vol. II, The
Legend of Johnny Cash Vol. II, The
Legend of Johnny Cash Vol. II, The
Legend of Johnny Cash Vol. II, The
Legend of Johnny Cash Vol. II, The
Legend of Johnny Cash Vol. II, The
Legend of Johnny Cash Vol. II, The